World's Most Dangerous Roads is a British TV series in which two celebrities are filmed as they journey by 4×4 vehicle along roads considered among the world's most dangerous. The show was initially broadcast on BBC Two from 2011 to 2013, and narrated by actor Adrian Dunbar.

A new series was commissioned for the channel Dave, and shown in 2023.

Episode list

Series overview

Series 1 (2011)

Series 2 (2012)

Series 3 (2012–13)

Series 4 (2023) 
All episodes were made available on UKTV Play on 12 February 2023.

References

External links

2011 British television series debuts
2013 British television series endings
2010s British travel television series
BBC high definition shows
BBC television documentaries
BBC travel television series
English-language television shows
Television series by Warner Bros. Television Studios
Road safety
Transport-related lists of superlatives